The Milwaukee Bucks Radio Network (branded as the BMO Bucks Radio Network) is a 16-station radio network in Wisconsin and Michigan that broadcasts basketball games and related programming for the Milwaukee Bucks of the National Basketball Association. Since the Bucks inaugural season, WTMJ/620 in Milwaukee, Wisconsin, has served as the flagship station for the network.

Announcers
Former Dallas Mavericks broadcaster Ted Davis was part of the BMO Bucks Radio Network from 1997–2021. Dennis Krause, the sports director of Spectrum's local news channel Spectrum News 1, was part of the Bucks Radio Network from 1996–2021. Davis did play-by-play for every game, with Krause providing color commentary at home games. 

After the 2021 NBA Finals, which ended with the Bucks' winning their first NBA Championship in 50 years, Davis announced his retirement in August of 2021. Davis was replaced by David Koehn, who'd been the play-by-play broadcaster for the University of Virginia men's basketball team. Krause also left as the color commentator prior to the 2021-22 Bucks season for undisclosed reasons, and was replaced by Ben Brust, a former Wisconsin Badgers men's basketball player and analyst for the Big Ten Network.

Programming

Pre-game
The pre-game show is Buck Shots.

Post-game
The post-game show is made up of two parts, the first half hour being the Radio.com Post Game Show, and the last hour being Bucks And-One (branded as Bucks And-One Presented by Noble Vines), which airs only on ESPN Milwaukee and ESPN Madison. Both parts are hosted by Justin Garcia.

Stations

Affiliates (15 stations)

All radio streams are blacked out beyond their station's coverage area due to NBA streaming rules.

Wisconsin

Michigan

Bold denotes the Flagship station.

Source:

References

Milwaukee Bucks
National Basketball Association on the radio
Sports radio networks in the United States